The 2006 S-Pulse season was S-Pulse's fifteenth season in existence and their fourteenth season in the J1 League. The club also competed in the Emperor's Cup and the J.League Cup. The team finished the season fourth in the league.

Competitions

Domestic results

J. League 1

Emperor's Cup

J. League Cup

Player statistics

Other pages
 J. League official site

Shimizu S-Pulse
Shimizu S-Pulse seasons